A Laracha is a municipality of northwestern Spain in the province of A Coruña, in the autonomous community of Galicia. It belongs to the comarca of Bergantiños. It has a population of 11,337 inhabitants (INE, 2011).

References

External links
Concello de A Laracha

Municipalities in the Province of A Coruña